The Alsace was an American automobile manufactured by Piedmont between 1920 and 1921 for Automotive Products Co. of New York, made with right-hand drive for export purposes.

The car differed from other Piedmont products chiefly because it used a Rolls-Royce-shaped radiator.

References
Keith Marvin, "Alsace", in G.N. Georgano, ed., The Complete Encyclopedia of Motorcars 1885-1968  (New York: E.P. Dutton and Co., 1974), pp. 37.

Vintage vehicles
Defunct motor vehicle manufacturers of the United States